Galopando TV is a Venezuelan community television channel.  It was created in August 2004 and can be seen in the community of Tucupido in the Jose Felix Ribas Municipality of the Guarico State of Venezuela on UHF channel 58.  Jesus Vargas is the legal representative of the foundation that owns this channel.

Galopando TV does not have a website.

See also
List of Venezuelan television channels

Television networks in Venezuela
Television stations in Venezuela
Mass media in Venezuela